Spittal is a hamlet or small village in East Lothian, Scotland, UK, on the B1377, east of Longniddry, south-south-west of Aberlady and to the west of Garleton and north of Gladsmuir. It is close to both Redhouse Castle, Gosford House and Spittal House.

The placename "Spittal" suggests a religious community running a pilgrim's hostel or hospice.

See also
List of places in East Lothian

References

External links

Canmore - Spittal site record
Canmore - Redhouse Dean Fort site record

Villages in East Lothian